Serra Kaleli is a Turkish diplomat and former ambassador of Turkey.

Kaleli was vice consul in West Berlin, Germany  from 1987 to 1990. Her next post was Second Secretary at the diplomatic mission in Islamabad, Pakistan for two years until 1992. She worked as First Secretary in Kyiv, Ukraine between 1992 and 1994. After two years of service back in the Ministry, she was assigned in 1996 to Washington D.C., United States serving four years as counselor. Before she was appointed as a counselor to London, United Kingdom in 2005, Kaleli worked in the Ministry for another five years. Her husband, diplomat Bahadır Kaleli, and her one-and-half years old daughter accompanied her in London. Returned home in 2009, she worked three years in the Ministry.

Kaleli was appointed Ambassador of Turkey to Slovenia taking office on 1 August 2012. She served in Ljubljana until 16 November 2016.

In September 2017, she became vicarious member of the Supervisory Board in the Ministry.

References

Living people
Turkish women ambassadors
Ambassadors of Turkey to Slovenia
Place of birth missing (living people)
Year of birth missing (living people)